Tadros also known as Les Frères Tadros / the Tadros Brothers / Les jumeaux Tadros / Duo Tadros are a Quebec-based Canadian musical duo consisting of singer-songwriters (identical twin brothers) Daniel "Dan" Tadros and Eric Tadros (born in Montreal in 1976). The Tadros brothers, of mixed Egyptian and Italian origin, are multilingual performers with songs composed in both French and English, and also singing in Spanish and Italian.  They are the only artists signed to "Due Belier Disques" record label, which is the label they own.

Career
Identical twin brothers Daniel and Eric Tadros studied Marketing at Montreal's Concordia University. Upon their graduation, they decided to follow a musical career. Their initial release was "Maze" (2000) followed by "Pure Pleasure" (2001) and "PornStar" (2003).  Soon followed their debut studio album of the same title Yo Quiero Bailar that includes also an English and French version remix of the single hit from Sonia & Selena.

In 2007, Tadros released two albums, the all-English Pure Pleasure and the all-French album Vis ta vie. Four of the songs of the album were written in a specially constructed 4 feet by 4 feet incubator at Place des Arts where they stayed continuously for a full week in the area popularly known as "bulle" attracting big media attention.

Also famous are their "singing billboards" initiative in which they hired a number of billboard in strategic positions around Montreal, that would broadcast for a whole week 24 hours on 24 music by Tadros thus attracting passersby. They claim they are also planning to embark on Space Adventures trip to outer space where they want to perform a song dedicated to universal peace. In 2012, they released their English-language album Under My Skin and in 2013, a new single "Rebel" in both English featuring Julie Lévesque and French featuring additionally O.T MC (from Dubmatique).

In February 2016, they released their all-English language album Djembe on Due Belier Records where they are credited as Tadros Brothers.

In May 2020, they play active roles in a protest against restrictive measures related to coronavirus, where they claim "the right to be infected if they want to", while relaying false information on social media.

Discography

Albums

EPs

Remixes

Singles / Videography
2000: "Maze"
2001: "Pure Pleasure"
2003: "PornStar"
2004: "Yo Quiero Bailar"
2005: "Être aimé"
2006: "Living"
2008: "Vis ta vie"
2013: "Play the Game (Go) / "La game (Go)" (French version)
2013: "Rebel" (feat. Julie L.) / (French version feat. O.T MC & Julie L.)
2016: "Oh Oh World Cup"
2016: 'C'es ainsi"
2016: "Djembe"
2016: "Message" 
2019: "Cet été (Beachday Everyday)"
2020: "Ça va bien aller"

References

External links
Tadros Official website

Musical groups established in 2000
Musical groups from Montreal
Canadian pop music groups
Sibling musical duos
Canadian musical duos
2000 establishments in Quebec